The Waupaca Post Office is located in Waupaca, Wisconsin.

History
The post office was a project of the Works Progress Administration. It opened in 1939.

References

Post office buildings on the National Register of Historic Places in Wisconsin
National Register of Historic Places in Waupaca County, Wisconsin
Works Progress Administration in Wisconsin
Neoclassical architecture in Wisconsin
Brick buildings and structures